Trophocosta nummifera is a species of moth of the family Tortricidae. It is found in New Guinea.

The wingspan is about 11 mm. The forewings are clear yellow, with scattered ferruginous-orange dots and strigula. There are three small patches on the costa at the base, at one-third and beyond the middle, mixed with fuscous and spotted with bright leaden-metallic. There is also a patch on the middle of the dorsum and a large irregular patch on the tornus and lower part of the termen reaching half across the wing. This patch is ferruginous-orange, somewhat mixed with fuscous and spotted with bright leaden-metallic. There are several small pale metallic spots towards the apex. The hindwings are grey, but rather darker posteriorly.

References

Moths described in 1910
Tortricini
Moths of New Guinea
Taxa named by Edward Meyrick